Bruce Franklin Pennington (born July 18, 1946) is an American psychologist and Professor Emeritus in the Department of Psychology at the University of Denver. He is recognized for his research on developmental disorders such as autism, attention-deficit hyperactivity disorder, and developmental dyslexia.

References

External links
Faculty page

Living people
1946 births
21st-century American psychologists
American developmental psychologists
Attention deficit hyperactivity disorder researchers
Dyslexia researchers
Autism researchers
University of Denver faculty
Harvard University alumni
Duke University alumni
20th-century American psychologists